Gusheh (lit.: corner) may refer to:
Dastgah, a Persian musical system
Gusheh, Farsan, a village in Chaharmahal and Bakhtiari Province, Iran
Gusheh, Kiar, a village in Chaharmahal and Bakhtiari Province, Iran
Gusheh, Lordegan, a village in Chaharmahal and Bakhtiari Province, Iran
Gusheh, Hamadan, a village in Hamadan Province, Iran
Gusheh-ye Badi ol Zaman, a village in Hamadan Province, Iran
Gusheh-ye Sad-e Vaqas, a village in Hamadan Province, Iran
Gusheh, Khuzestan, a village in Khuzestan Province, Iran
Gusheh-ye Shahzadeh Qasem, a village in Kohgiluyeh and Boyer-Ahmad Province, Iran
Gusheh, Dorud, a village in Lorestan Province, Iran
Shahanshah, Lorestan, a village in Lorestan Province, Iran
Gusheh, Markazi, a village in Markazi Province, Iran
Gusheh-ye Mohammad Malek, a village in Markazi Province, Iran
Qusheh, a village in Semnan Province, Iran
Gusheh-ye Olya (disambiguation)
Gusheh-ye Sofla (disambiguation)

See also
 Kusheh (disambiguation)